Balto Star (foaled  March 7, 1998, in Kentucky) is an American Thoroughbred racehorse and the winner of the 2003 United Nations Stakes.

Career

Balto Star's first race was on September 16, 2000, at Belmont Park, where he finished in 8th place. He did not pick up his first win until January 1st, 2001, at Aqueduct. He picked up another win at the Aqueduct on February 18, 2001, then won his first graded race, the Turfway Spiral Stakes on March 24, 2001.

He then won his next graded race, the 2001 Arkansas Derby. This would be his last graded in for almost two years, until he came back with a win at the 2003 Whirlaway Handicap. In July, he picked up a win at the 2003 United Nations Stakes. In late 2003, he picked up two more graded wins. He won the 2003 Red Smith Handicap in November, and then won the December 27th, 2003 W. L. McKnight Handicap.

His final race was on October 8, 2004, where he won the  Breeders' Cup Stakes.

Pedigree

References

1998 racehorse births